1 Canadian Mechanized Brigade Group Headquarters and Signal Squadron is a Regular Force army unit of the Canadian Armed Forces at CFB Edmonton. The squadron is part of 3rd Canadian Division's 1 Canadian Mechanized Brigade Group (1 CMBG).

History 
1 Canadian Mechanized Brigade Group Headquarters and Signal Squadron traces its heritage back to the formation of the Royal Canadian Corps of Signals on 24 October 1903. Before the end of the Second World War, small signal sections provided tactical communications for the Canadian Army's various brigade headquarters. After the war, brigade communication requirements expanded significantly, and it became necessary for the army to expand these sections into squadrons.
In 1958, as part of the army reorganization, the 1st Canadian Infantry Brigade Group relocated its headquarters to Calgary from Edmonton. On 15 May 1958 as part of this reorganization, 1 Signal Squadron was formed from elements of the 1 Canadian Divisional Signal Regiment in Borden, Ontario. The squadron was garrisoned in Calgary.
Initially, 1 Signal Squadron was a separate unit from the brigade group headquarters. In 1968, for reasons of efficiency and cost effectiveness, 1st Canadian Infantry Brigade Group Headquarters and 1 Signal Squadron were combined into 1 Canadian Brigade Group Headquarters and Signal Squadron. The role of the squadron was and continues to be the provision of communications, security and service support to the commander of 1 Canadian Mechanized Brigade Group and his staff.

Commanding officers

Major A.P. Cote, May 1958 – July 1959
Major E.G. Coombe, July 1959 – June 1962
Major D.C. Coughtry, June 1962 – August 1964
Major B.H. Bennett, August 1964 – May 1965
Major P.H. Sutton, January 1966 – July 1967
Major J.D.B. Kent, July 1967 – March 1969
Captain J.H. Racine, March 1969 – July 1969
Major G.L. Mowry, July 1969 – July 1971
Major A.J. Freeman, July 1971 – July 1973
Major D.R.A. McLean, July 1973 – April 1975
Captain Routledge, April 1975 – February 1976
Major J.M. Savage, February 1976 – July 1978
Major P.P.A.J.D. Boudreau, July 1978 – July 1981
Major J.N. Brittain, July 1981 – July 1983
Major L.M. Juteau, July 1983 – July 1985
Major J. Holt, July 1985 – July 1988
Major H.W. Coyle, July 1988 – July 1990
Major R.W. Wright, July 1990 – July 1992
Major R.C. Johnston, July 1992 – July 1994
Major A.A. McPhee, July 1994 – July 1997
Major B.K. Green, July 1997 – July 1998
Major S.W. Hall, July 1998 – February 2000
Major R.T. Williams, February 2000 – July 2000
Major P.R. Bossé, July 2000 – July 2002
Lieutenant-Colonel A.H.J. Schwab,	 July 2002 – June 2004
Major J. Blythe, June 2004 – December 2006
Lieutenant-Colonel G.T. Whelan, December 2006 – August 2008
Lieutenant-Colonel P.R.T Whynacht, August 2008 – June 2010
Major N.Y. Lemieux, June 2010 – January 2011
Lieutenant-Colonel L.M. Smid, January 2011 – June 2013
Major J.Y.A. Côté, June 2013 – June 2015
Major W.K.E. Jull, June 2015 – 2017
Major J.C. Gash, June 2017 – June 2018
Major B.N. Blyth, June 2018 - Aug 2020
Major R.W. Thompson, Aug 2020- June 2022
Major G.J. Barr, June 2022 – Present

Regimental sergeants major 

WO2 S. Reading, 1958 – 1959
WO2 G.E. Wilson, 1959–1960
WO2 K.F. NcKnight, 1960 – 1961
WO2 W. Shannon, 1961 – 1963
WO2 J.M. Blair, 1963 – 1965
WO2 E.G. Chartrand, 1965 – 1967
MWO B. Murphy, 1967–1969
MWO Clark, 1969 – 1972
MWO H. Searls, 1972–1975
CWO B. Janik, June 1975 – June 1978
CWO W. Kiely, June 1978 – June 1981
CWO F.O. Marryatt, June 1981 – July 1986
CWO S.A. Macaulay, July 1986 – July 1990
CWO J.E. Pollock, July 1990 – September 1994
CWO J.C. Browne, September 1994 – March 1997
MWO A.H.  Whittal, March 1997 – August 1997
CWO H.D. Elhorn, August 1997 – February 2000
MWO R.F. Phillips, February 2000 – June 2000
CWO J.M. Laviolette, June 2000 – July 2003
CWO V.W. Kelley, June 2003 – February 2005
CWO A.O. Lopes, February 2005 – April 2006
CWO R.J. Richard, January 2006 – November 2007
CWO W.A. Brown, November 2007 – June 2010
CWO F.I.E. Petzold, June 2010 – October 2011
CWO P.C. West, October 2011 – June 2013
CWO R.S.  Guérin, June 2013 – June 2015
CWO T.F. Stevens, June 2015 – June 2018
CWO S.B. Edwards, June 2018 - July 2021
CWO S.R.J. Loyer, July 2021 – Present

References

See also 
 1 Canadian Mechanized Brigade Group

Squadrons of Canada